Arthur Ernest "Ernie" Fitzgerald (July 31, 1926 – January 31, 2019) was an American engineer, a member of the Senior Executive Service in the United States Air Force, and a prominent U.S. government whistleblower.

Biography
Fitzgerald was a member of the Senior Executive Service, a management systems deputy, Office of the Assistant Secretary of the Air Force for Financial Management and Comptroller, Headquarters U.S. Air Force, Washington, D.C. He was responsible for the development of improved management controls generally, specifically including management information control systems, economic cost effectiveness analysis, statistical programs and analysis, cost estimating and analysis, and productivity enhancement and measurement. The latter responsibility includes supervising Air Force performance measurement activities.

Following service in the U.S. Navy, Fitzgerald earned a bachelor of science degree in industrial engineering from the University of Alabama. He is a registered professional engineer and has worked on several successful patents, including one issued in his name. He is the author of "The High Priests of Waste" and "The Pentagonists." Fitzgerald died in Falls Church, Virginia, on January 31, 2019, at the age of 92.

Career
After working for a number of years as an engineer and in management, Fitzgerald was employed by the U.S. Air Force as Deputy for Management Systems in 1965. While employed at the Pentagon Fitzgerald testified to Congress in 1968 and 1969 about the concealed cost overruns and the technical problems of the Lockheed C-5A transport airplane. He was accused of revealing classified information and was fired on order of President Richard M. Nixon.

He later successfully appealed to the Civil Service Commission to be reinstated. Furthermore, he was involved in several legal cases that were significant in establishing presidential immunity and defining the rights of government employees, including the U.S. Supreme Court case Nixon v. Fitzgerald.

Whistleblower
In 1968, Fitzgerald reported a $2.3 billion cost overrun in the Lockheed C-5 aircraft program. As a congressional witness before the Joint Economic Committee, he rejected the advice of Air Force officials and testified with candor and transparency about billions of dollars in avionics program cost overruns and other technical problems.

In response to Fitzgerald's testimony, President Richard M. Nixon directed that he be fired. "It was reported that Nixon told aides to 'get rid of that son of a bitch.'" In executing the president's order, Fitzgerald was ultimately terminated by Defense Secretary Melvin Laird.

Because of his candor and commitment to the truth, Fitzgerald was a driving force for whistleblower protections. Fitzgerald continued to fight a four-decade-long campaign against fraud, waste, and abuse within the department. On page 108 in his book The Pentagonists, he states that "The Carter Reform Act -- or, as many people I knew called it, the Carter Deform Act -- was a reckless reversal of governmental progress since 1883, and promised some dire developments."

Career chronology
 1951–1953, quality control engineer, Stockham Valves and Fitting Co., Birmingham, Ala.
 1953–1954, quality control engineer, Hayes Aircraft Corp.
 1954–1957, senior plant industrial engineer, Kaiser Aluminum and Chemical Corp.
 1957–1961, managing associate and principal, Arthur Young and Co.
 1962–1965, president, Performance Technology Corp.
 1965–1970, deputy for management systems, U.S. Air Force
 1970–1973, consultant to Joint Economic Committee, House Post Office and Civil Service Commission, and corporate director of Rockland Industries
 1973–1982, deputy for productivity management, U.S. Air Force
 1982–2006, management systems deputy, Office of the Assistant Secretary of the Air Force for Financial Management and Comptroller, Headquarters U.S. Air Force, Washington, D.C.

Awards and honors
1967 Air Force nominee, Department of Defense Distinguished Civilian Service Award
1973 Judge Henry T. Edgerton Award
1976 Freedom Award
1977 Marshall Engineers and Scientists Association Award
1986 Sigma Delta Chi First Amendment Award
1988 Cavallo Foundation Award
1989 First Amendment Award, Tau Beta Phi, Alpha Pi Mu and Phi Eta Sigma, Washington and Lee University, Lexington, Va.
1996 The Paul H. Douglas Ethics in Government Award

Professional memberships and associations
Institute of Industrial Engineering
American Society for Quality Control
Director, Fund for Constitutional Government
Past chairman, National Taxpayers Union

Books authored
The High Priests of Waste (1972)
The Pentagonists: An Insider's View of Waste, Mismanagement and Fraud in Defense Spending (1989)
Electric Machinery: The Processes, Devices, and Systems of Electromechanical Energy Conversion (1952)

See also
Anti-Gag Statute
Office of the Inspector General, U.S. Department of Defense
Department of Defense Whistleblower Program

Notes

References

Paul Douglas Ethics in Government Award biography
Nixon vs. Fitzgerald 
The Journal of Public Inquiry, Marshalling Whistleblower Protection by Eric B. Kempen and Andrew P. Bakaj, https://web.archive.org/web/20100527094148/http://www.ignet.gov/randp/sp09jpi.pdf at 6.
Meister, Christoph: Missbrauch des Executive Privilege. Der Whistleblower A. Ernest Fitzgerald vor dem U.S. Kongress und die Reaktion der Regierung Nixon, in: The Journal for Intelligence, Propaganda and Security Studies, Vol.7, No. 1 (2012). 67-78.

American whistleblowers
American political writers
American male non-fiction writers
American industrial engineers
University of Alabama alumni
1926 births
2019 deaths
Military personnel from Birmingham, Alabama
Writers from Birmingham, Alabama